The year 1844 in architecture involved some significant architectural events and new buildings.

Buildings and structures

Buildings completed

 June 12 – Abingdon Road railway station near Culham on the line to Oxford in England, designed by I. K. Brunel.
 August 21 – St Mary's Church, Newcastle upon Tyne (Roman Catholic, later Cathedral) in England, designed by Augustus Pugin.
 August 27 – St Barnabas Church, Nottingham (Roman Catholic, later Cathedral) in England, designed by Augustus Pugin.
 October – The Grange, Ramsgate (house), designed for himself by Augustus Pugin.
 Autumn – The Scott Monument in Edinburgh, Scotland, designed by George Meikle Kemp.
 New buildings for Marischal College, Aberdeen, Scotland, designed by Archibald Simpson.
 Bell tower of Dormition Cathedral, Kharkiv, Ukraine.
 Berkshire County Gaol, Reading, England, designed by George Gilbert Scott with William Bonython Moffatt.
 Berry Hill, near Halifax, Virginia.

Events
 July 27 – Vang Stave Church, relocated from Vang, Norway, to Brückenberg, Silesia, is reconsecrated.
 Eugène Viollet-le-Duc and Jean-Baptiste Lassus win a competition for the restoration of the cathedral of Notre-Dame de Paris.

Awards
 Grand Prix de Rome, architecture:  Prosper Desbuisson.

Births

 January 3 – Hermann Eggert, German architect (died 1920)
 June 23 – Émile Bénard, French architect and painter (died 1929)
 July 3 – Dankmar Adler, German-born American architect (died 1900)

Deaths
 March 6 – George Meikle Kemp, designer of the Scott Monument in Edinburgh (born 1795; drowned).
 April 15 – Charles Bulfinch, first native-born American to practice architecture as a profession (born 1763)

References

Architecture
Years in architecture
19th-century architecture